The 2007 NCAA Division III men's basketball tournament was a single-elimination tournament to determine the men's collegiate basketball national champion of National Collegiate Athletic Association (NCAA) Division III. It began on March 1, 2007, and concluded on March 17, 2007, with a championship game in the Salem Civic Center of Salem, Virginia, which was won by Amherst College over Virginia Wesleyan 80-67.

Qualifying teams
The Division III Championships Committee selected 59 schools to participate in the 2007 tournament. Thirty-seven teams earned automatic qualification by winning their respective conferences. Additionally, four independent (not affiliated with a conference with an automatic bid) teams and 18 other at-large teams from the remaining independent teams and automatic qualifying conferences — who did not receive their conference automatic qualification—were selected.

See also
 2007 NCAA Division III women's basketball tournament

NCAA Division III men's basketball tournament
Ncaa tournament
2007 in sports in Virginia